Kepo may be,

Kolu Kepo
Kepo language